"Black Eyes Blue" is a song by American musician Corey Taylor, frontman of metal bands Slipknot and Stone Sour. It was his first solo single from his first solo album CMFT. It peaked at number one on the Billboard Mainstream Rock Songs chart in 2020.

Background
The song was first released on July 29, 2020. It was released concurrently with another single – "CMFT Must Be Stopped". A lyric video was released on the same day. A full music video was later released on August 19, 2020. The song debuted at number 24 on the Billboard Mainstream Rock Songs and number 21 on the Billboard Hot Hard Rock Songs chart, just after a single week of being released.

Themes and composition
With Corey Taylor's comments on the CMFT album, in regards to it being across many various genre and in styles not commonly found in his band's Slipknot and Stone Sour, publications noted the difference in sound between "Black Eyes Blue" and "CMFT Must Be Stopped". While publications commonly referred to the latter as rap rock, "Black Eyes Blue" was described as power pop by Rolling Stone magazine. Consequence of Sound referred to "Black Eyes Blue" as "more of a straight-ahead rocker" with "melodic punk-like verses reminiscent of [the band] Rise Against".

Personnel
Adapted from NME.

Band
 Corey Taylor – vocals
 Christian Martucci – guitar
 Zach Throne – guitar
 Jason Christopher – bass
 Dustin Robert – drums

Production
 Jay Ruston – production

Charts

References

2020 singles
2020 songs
Corey Taylor songs